Janis Kelly may refer to:
 Janis Kelly (volleyball)
 Janis Kelly (soprano)